San Marino competed at the 2004 Summer Olympics in Athens, Greece from 13 to 29 August 2004.

Athletics

Sammarinese athletes have so far achieved qualifying standards in the following athletics events (up to a maximum of 3 athletes in each event at the 'A' Standard, and 1 at the 'B' Standard):

Men

Shooting

Shooting was San Marino's strongest sport of the Athens games. Amici was just two shots short of qualifying for the final, while Felici was even closer, managing to force a shoot-off and missing out by just a single point.

Men

Women

Swimming

Men

See also
 San Marino at the 2005 Mediterranean Games

References

External links
Official Report of the XXVIII Olympiad
San Marino NOC

Nations at the 2004 Summer Olympics
2004 Summer Olympics
Summer Olympics